Smotrych can refer to:

Geography
 Smotrych (urban-type settlement), an urban-type settlement in Kamianets-Podilskyi Raion of Khmelnytskyi Oblast
 Smotrych (village) (uk), a village in Kamianets-Podilskyi Raion of Khmelnytskyi Oblast
 Smotrych (river), which flows through Khmelnytskyi Oblast
 Smotrych (mountain), a hill of the Chornohora mountain range

Other
 Bezalel Smotrich, Israeli politician, Member of Knesset and Government minister